Jack Brier (born June 25, 1946) is an American politician who served as the Secretary of State of Kansas from 1978 to 1987.

References

1946 births
Living people
Secretaries of State of Kansas
Kansas Republicans